In geometry, the great rhombidodecacron (or Great dipteral ditriacontahedron) is a nonconvex isohedral polyhedron. It is the dual of the great rhombidodecahedron. It is visually identical to the great deltoidal hexecontahedron. Its faces are antiparallelograms.

Proportions
The dihedral angle equals . The ratio between the lengths of the long edges and the short ones equals , which is the golden ratio. Part of each face lies inside the solid, hence is invisible in solid models.

References
 p. 88

External links 
 

Dual uniform polyhedra